The Carnac stones are an exceptionally dense collection of megalithic sites near the south coast of Brittany in northwestern France, consisting of stone alignments (rows), dolmens (stone tombs), tumuli (burial mounds) and single menhirs (standing stones). More than 3,000 prehistoric standing stones were hewn from local granite and erected by the pre-Celtic people of Brittany and form the largest such collection in the world. Most of the stones are within the Breton municipality of Carnac, but some to the east are within neighboring La Trinité-sur-Mer. The stones were erected at some stage during the Neolithic period, probably around 3300 BC, but some may date to as early as 4500 BC.

Although the stones date from 4500–3300 BC, modern myths associated them with 1st century AD Roman and later Christian occupations. A Christian myth associated with the stones held that they were pagan soldiers in pursuit of Pope Cornelius when he turned them to stone. Brittany has its own local versions of the Arthurian cycle. Local tradition similarly claims that the reason they stand in such perfectly straight lines is that they are a Roman legion turned to stone by Merlin.

In recent centuries, many of the sites have been neglected, with reports of dolmens being used as sheep shelters, chicken sheds or even ovens. Even more commonly, stones have been removed to make way for roads, or as building materials. The continuing management of the sites remains a controversial topic.

According to Neil Oliver's BBC documentary A History of Ancient Britain, the alignments would have been built by hunter-gatherer people ("These weren't erected by Neolithic farmers, but by Mesolithic hunters"). That would place them in a different category from Stonehenge in England, which has been claimed to be the work of Early European Farmers. The question of which people Carnac stones are to be attributed to is still debated.

Alignments

There are three major groups of stone rowsMénec, Kermario and Kerlescan. They may have once formed a single group but have been split up as stones were removed for other purposes.

The standing stones are made of weathered granite from local outcroppings that once extensively covered the area.

Ménec alignments

There are what Alexander Thom considered to be the remains of stone circles at either end. According to the tourist office there is a "cromlech containing 71 stone blocks" at the western end and a very ruined cromlech at the eastern end.

Kermario alignment

This fan-like layout recurs a little further along to the east in the Kermario (House of the Dead) alignment. A stone circle to the east end, where the stones are shorter, was revealed by aerial photography.

Kerlescan alignments

A smaller group of 555 stones, further to the east of the other two sites. At the extreme west, where the stones are tallest, there is a stone circle which has 39 stones. There may also be another stone circle to the north.

Petit-Ménec alignments
A much smaller group, further east again of Kerlescan, falling within the commune of La Trinité-sur-Mer. These are now set in woods, and most are covered with moss and ivy.

Tumuli

There are several tumuli, mounds of earth built up over a grave. In this area, they generally feature a passage leading to a central chamber which once held neolithic artifacts. 

Three exceptionally large burial mounds are known from the Carnac and Morbihan area, dating from the mid-5th millennium BC and known collectively as 'Carnacéen tumuli': Saint-Michel, Tumiac and Mané-er-Hroëk. Each of these tumuli contained a megalithic burial chamber, containing the burial of only one individual, along with numerous large polished stone axeheads, stone arm-rings, and jewellery made from callaïs. Scientific analyses have shown that many of the axeheads are made of jadeitite from the Italian Alps, whilst the callaïs was imported from south-western Iberia. Archaeological evidence indicates that the callaïs was brought from Iberia by boat, across the Bay of Biscay, rather than along the coast or overland. Some of the Carnacéen jade axeheads are up to 46 cm in length and may have taken over a thousand hours to produce, on top of the time required to quarry the material and transport it to Carnac. The extraordinary nature of these burials, the scale of the tumuli, the distant exchange networks and effort involved, all indicate that these were the burials of extremely important elite individuals, that some researchers have described as "divine kings". The large-scale effort and organisation involved in the construction of megalithic monuments further suggests the existence of rulers or kings in the Carnac and Morbihan region. A similar situation has been described for the later megalithic culture in Ireland, which shows some close similarities to the megalithic culture in Brittany. Based on archaeological, DNA and ethnographic evidence it has been suggested that an elite male buried in the Newgrange passage grave, c. 3200 BC, may have been a "god-king" and part of a "dynastic elite". Similarities have also been noted with the Michelsberg culture in northeastern France and Germany (c. 4200 BC), which featured large tumulus burials within fortified settlements and the use of Alpine jade axes, all associated with the emergence of "high-ranking elites".

The Carnacéen tumuli were contemporary with the rich burials of the Varna culture in Bulgaria (c. 4500 BC), which contained more gold than all excavated sites from the rest of the world combined in the 5th millennium BC. The Varna burials attest to the existence of powerful elites in southeastern Europe at the same time as they appear in Carnac. Grave 43 of the Varna necropolis, which contained a single male buried with a sceptre and numerous gold ornaments, also contained an Alpine jade axehead.

Saint-Michel

The tumulus of Saint-Michel was constructed between 5000 BCE and 3400 BCE. It required  of stone and earth. Its function was a tomb for the members of the ruling class. It contained various funerary objects, such as 15 stone chests, large jade axes, pottery, and callaïs jewellery, most of which are currently held by the Museum of Prehistory of Carnac. It was excavated in 1862 by René Galles with a series of vertical pits, digging down . Le Rouzic also excavated it between 1900 and 1907, discovering the tomb and the stone chests.

A chapel was built on top in 1663 and was rebuilt in 1813, before being destroyed in 1923.  The current building is an identical reconstruction of the 1663 chapel, built in 1926.

Tumiac

The tumulus of Tumiac is located in Arzon, in the Rhuys peninsula, south of the Gulf of Morbihan. It is also known as 'Caesar's mound' because, according to local legend, it served as an observatory for Julius Caesar during his war against the Veneti in 56 BC. 

The site was excavated in 1853. The crater visible at the top of the tumulus corresponds to the vertical hole made at the time for its exploration. It was the subject of new excavations and work in 1934, which brought to light several secondary burials.

The tumulus, circular/elliptical in shape, is made up of layers of clay. It measures 50m in diameter and 15m in height. It contains a central rectangular burial chamber 4.40m long, 2.40m wide and 1.75m high. This chamber is made up of three monolithic supports and is covered with a quartz slab 4.80m long. It had a wooden floor and two engraved side slabs. The funerary chamber contained rich furniture consisting of 11 jadeite axes, 26 fibrolith axes and 249 callaïs beads. These objects are kept in the Archaeological Museum of Vannes. According to carbon-14 dating, the tumulus of Tumiac was erected between 4790 and 4530 BC.

The tumulus of Tumiac has been classified as a historical monument since 1923.

Mané-er-Hroëk

The Tumulus of Mané-er-Hroëk (also known as the Tumulus du Ruyk is located in Locmariaquer, Morbihan, immediately west of the hamlet of Er-Hroueg and about 1 km northeast of the Pierres Plates dolmen.

The tumulus comprises a rectangular burial vault of about 5m by 3m, covered with two roofing slabs, supporting a mound about 100m long and 60m wide. The tumulus rises to approximately 15m above sea level, or almost 8m above the natural ground. The current entrance, with a staircase, is a modern addition. An engraved stele, found broken into three pieces, stands next to the entrance.

The tumulus was excavated in 1863 by the Polymathic Society of Morbihan. These excavations led to the discovery of the vault and stele and brought to light 106 precious stone axes (the largest of which measures 46cm), 49 callaïs beads and 9 callaïs pendants. These objects were subsequently deposited in the Archeological Museum of Vannes. The tumulus has been classified as a historical monument since 1889.

Moustoir
It has a dolmen at the west end, and two tombs at the east end.

Grave goods

Dolmens

 
There are several dolmens scattered around the area. These dolmens are generally considered to have been tombs; however, the acidic soil of Brittany has eroded away the bones. They were constructed with several large stones supporting a capstone, then buried under a mound of earth. In many cases, the mound is no longer present, sometimes due to archeological excavation, and only the large stones remain, in various states of ruin.

Er-Roc'h-Feutet
North, near the Chapelle de La Madeleine. Has a completely covered roof.

La Madeleine
It is named after the nearby Chapelle de La Madeleine, which is still used.

Kercado

A rare dolmen still covered by its original cairn. It has some Megalithic art carved on its inner surfaces in the form of serpentines and a human-sized double-axe symbol carved in the underside of its main roof slab. In ancient cultures, the axe and more precisely the bi-pennis used to represent the lightning powers of divinity. It was constructed around 4600 BC and used for approximately 3,000 years.

Mané Brizil

Kerlescan
A roughly rectangular mound, with only one capstone remaining. It is aligned east-to-west, with a passage entrance to the south.

Kermarquer
On a small hill, has two separate chambers.

Mané-Kerioned
(Pixies' mound or Grotte de Grionnec):A group of three dolmens with layout unique in Brittany,  once covered by a tumulus. Whereas most groups of dolmens are parallel, these are arranged in a horseshoe. The largest of the three is at the east, .

Crucuno

Crucuno stone rectangle
Alexander Thom suggested it measured forty by thirty of his megalithic yards.

Other formations

There are some individual menhirs and at least one other formation which do not fit into the above categories.

Manio quadrilateral
An arrangement of stones to form the perimeter of a large rectangle.

Manio giant

Near the quadrilateral is a single massive menhir, now known as the "Giant".

Excavation and analysis

From the 1720s increasing interest was shown in these features. In 1796, for example, La Tour d'Auvergne attributed them to druidic gatherings. In 1805, A. Maudet de Penhoët claimed they represented stars in the sky.

Englishmen Francis Ronalds and Alexander Blair made a detailed survey of the stones in 1834.  Ronalds created the first accurate drawings of many of them with his patented perspective tracing instrument, which were printed in a book Sketches at Carnac (Brittany) in 1834.

Miln and Le Rouzic
The first extensive excavation was performed in the 1860s by Scottish antiquary James Miln (1819–1881), who reported that by then fewer than 700 of the 3,000 stones were still standing. Towards 1875, Miln engaged a local boy,  (1864–1939), as his assistant, and Zacharie learnt archaeology on the job. After Miln's death, he left the results of his excavations to the town of Carnac, and the James Miln Museum was established there by his brother Robert to house the artifacts. Zacharie became the director of the Museum and, although self-taught, became an internationally recognised expert on megaliths in the region. He too left the results of his work to the town, and the museum is now named Le Musée de Préhistoire James Miln – Zacharie le Rouzic.

Other theories

In 1887, H. de Cleuziou argued for a connection between the rows of stones and the directions of sunsets at the solstices.

Among more recent studies, Alexander Thom worked with his son Archie from 1970 to 1974 to carry out a detailed survey of the Carnac alignments, and produced a series of papers on the astronomical alignments of the stones as well as statistical analysis supporting his concept of the megalithic yard. Thom's megalithic yard has been challenged.

There are also general theories on the use of the stones as astronomical observatories, as has been claimed for Stonehenge. According to one such theory, the massive menhir at nearby Locmariaquer was linked to the alignments for such a purpose.

Management

The Musée de Préhistoire James Miln – Zacharie le Rouzic is at the centre of conserving and displaying the artefacts from the area.  It also contains the "world's largest collection [of] prehistoric[al] exhibits" with over 6,600 prehistoric objects from 136 different sites.

The monuments themselves were listed and purchased by the State at the start of the 20th century to protect them against quarrymen, and while this was successful at the time, in the middle of the century, redevelopment, changes to agricultural practices and increasing tourism bringing visitors to the stones led to rapid deterioration. The Ministère de la Culture et de la Communication (Heritage Ministry) re-examined the issue starting in 1984, and subsequently set up the ‘Mission Carnac’ in 1991 with the aim of rehabilitating and developing the alignments. This involved restricting public access, launching a series of scientific and technical studies, and producing a plan for conservation and development in the area.

As with the megalithic structure of Stonehenge in England, management of the stones can be controversial. Since 1991, the main groups of stone rows have been protected from the public by fences "to help vegetation growth", preventing visits except by organised tours. They are open during winter, however. 
When James Miln studied the stones in the 1860s, he reported that fewer than 700 of the 3,000 stones were still standing, and subsequent work during the 1930s and 1980s (using bulldozers) rearranged the stones, re-erecting some, to make way for roads or other structures. In 2002, protesters invaded the site, opening the padlocks and allowing tourists free entry. In particular, the group Collectif Holl a gevred (French and Breton for "the everyone-together collective") occupied the visitor centre for the Kermario alignment, demanding an immediate stop to current management plans and local input into further plans.

In recent years, management of the site has also experimented with allowing sheep to graze among the stones, in order to keep gorse and other weeds under control.

See also
Prehistory of Brittany
Passage grave
Megalith
List of megalithic sites
Michelsberg culture

References

Notes

General references
 
 
 
 Carnac: Guide pratique 2006 (provided by Carnac tourist office)

External links

Carnac stones official website
 Carnac official website
 Official website of Prehistory Museum of Carnac
 Carnac at france-for-visitors.com (includes map)
Online photo exhibition of the Carnac region's megaliths includes the giant menhir of Loqmariaquer, and marked and inscribed stones
An amateur's guide to visiting the Carnac stones by car
The megaliths of Carnac: Dolmen / passage graves – comprehensive list of dolmens in area with photos.
The Megalithic Portal and Megalith Map – GPS coordinates of megalithic sites
menhirslibres.org – website for a protest group.

Online maps
http://members.tripod.com/Menhirs/dolmen.html  – main sites in the Morbihan area
https://web.archive.org/web/20120204191614/http://www.bretagne-celtic.com/carte_carnac.htm  – historical map
http://www.megalithia.com/brittany/carnac/  – basic arrangement of the main alignments

Archaeoastronomy
Archaeological sites in Brittany
Archaeological sites in France
Megalithic monuments in Brittany
Stone Age Europe
Buildings and structures in Morbihan
Geography of Brittany
Tourist attractions in Morbihan
Stone Age sites in France
Stone circles in Europe
Monuments of the Centre des monuments nationaux